Ostrov u Bezdružic (until 1950 Ostrov) is a municipality and village in Plzeň-North District in the Plzeň Region of the Czech Republic. It has about 200 inhabitants.

Administrative parts
Villages of Krsov and Pláň are administrative parts of Ostrov u Bezdružic.

References

Villages in Plzeň-North District